Rafts and Dreams is a play by English playwright Robert Holman that was first performed in 1990, and published in 1991.

Plot
Beginning as a seeming domestic drama, Rafts and Dreams shows the relationship between obsessive-compulsive mysophobe Hetty and her soldier husband Leo, and their neighbour Neil – a victim of childhood sexual abuse who is now studying to be a doctor.  However, when Leo and Neil remove a tree stump from Leo's garden they find an underground lake under all London which expands to flood the entire world.  Leo makes a raft from their living room and as they float they meet the wife of the man who abused Neil.

Productions
Rafts and Dreams was first presented at the Royal Court Theatre in 1990.  The production was directed by John Dove and the cast was:

Neil Bell – Jonathan Cullen
Hetty – Adie Allen
Leo – Jason Watkins
Jo – Natasha Pyne
Alex – Ilan Ostrove
Woman – Maureen Hibbert

In 2003 the play was revived at the Royal Exchange, Manchester in a production directed by Tim Stark.

Critical reception
“While digging up the roots of a tree in the garden, Neil, Leo and Hetty uncover a vast underground lake which floods away the world.  With Leo at the tiller of his sawn-away living room, the trio begin a voyage over the earth's watery surface … Rafts and Dreams is a surrealist fantasy at its most thought-provoking, a play whose best bits manage (in both senses) to work like a dream.” – Paul Taylor, The Independent.

Encore Theatre Magazine described the play as “one of the great post-war British plays.”

References

Further reading
 London Theatre Record, Volume 10, Issues 14-26

 Rafts and Dreams is discussed in the context of Holman's other plays.

1990 plays
English plays
Plays set in London
Climate change plays
Child abuse in fiction
Plays set in Africa
Magic realism plays